Velizar Chernokozhev (born 23 April 1995) is a Bulgarian volleyball player for Sir Safety Conad Perugia and the Bulgarian national team.

He participated at the 2017 Men's European Volleyball Championship. He won a silver medal with Sir Safety Conad Perugia from the 2017, CEV Volleyball Champions League. In 2016, he played for the Bulgarian team Dobrudja 07 and became champion in serie A, Bulgaria Superleague CAMI-M. At the age of 21, in 2016, he was captain of the 'B' Bulgaria men's national team for the European League, where the team finished 4th. He participated in the first European Olympic Games in Baku in 2015 and won silver medal with the Bulgaria men's national team. In 2014 he won the Cup of Bulgaria with Levski Volley and was vice champion in the Bulgarian Superleague.

References

1995 births
Living people
Bulgarian men's volleyball players
Bulgarian expatriates in Italy
Expatriate volleyball players in Italy
European Games medalists in volleyball
European Games silver medalists for Bulgaria
Volleyball players at the 2015 European Games